The Poynting effect may refer to two unrelated physical phenomena.  Neither should be confused with the Poynting–Robertson effect.  All of these effects are named after John Henry Poynting, an English physicist.

Solid mechanics 
In solid mechanics, the Poynting effect is a Finite strain theory effect observed when an elastic cube is sheared between two plates and stress is developed in the direction normal to the sheared faces, or when a cylinder is subjected to torsion and the axial length changes. The Poynting phenomenon in torsion was noticed experimentally by J. H. Poynting.

Chemistry and thermodynamics 
In thermodynamics, the Poynting effect generally refers to the change in the fugacity of a liquid when a non-condensable gas is mixed with the vapor at saturated conditions.

Equivalently in terms of vapor pressure, if one assumes that the vapor and the non-condensable gas behave as ideal gases and an ideal mixture, it can be shown that:

where
 is the modified vapor pressure
 is the unmodified vapor pressure
 is the liquid molar volume
 is the liquid/vapor's gas constant
 is the temperature
 is the total pressure (vapor pressure + non-condensable gas)

A common example is the production of the medicine Entonox, a high-pressure mixture of nitrous oxide and oxygen.

References 

 C.O. Horgan and J. G. Murphy, Poynting and reverse Poynting effects in soft materials, Soft Matter, 13, 2017, 4916-4923.

Elasticity (physics)
Rubber properties
Gases